RuPaul's Drag Race: UK vs the World is a spin-off series of RuPaul's Drag Race UK. The series premiered on 1 February 2022. RuPaul acts as both the host and main judge, with Michelle Visage, Graham Norton and Alan Carr returning as supporting judges.

The contestants for the first series were announced on 17 January 2022.

The winner of the first series of RuPaul's Drag Race UK vs the World was Blu Hydrangea, with Mo Heart as the runner-up.

Production
On 21 December 2021, World of Wonder announced that RuPaul's Drag Race: UK Versus the World would premiere in February 2022, with the BBC adding that the series would coincide with the relaunch of BBC Three as a television channel. The series features nine international queens who have competed in the Drag Race franchise around the world. The series was filmed in March 2021, in Manchester at the same location as the third series of RuPaul's Drag Race UK.

This series the two best performing queens of the challenge "Lip Sync for the World", with the winner of the lip sync earning a gold "RuPeter Badge" and choosing which one of the bottom queens to eliminate.

Contestants

Ages, names, and cities stated are at time of filming.

Notes:

Contestant progress

Lip syncs
Legend:

Guest judges

Melanie C, singer
Daisy May Cooper, actress
Jonathan Bailey, actor
Clara Amfo, radio presenter
Michelle Keegan, actress
Jade Thirlwall, singer

Special guests
Guests who appeared in episodes, but did not judge on the main stage.

Episode 3
Johannes Radebe, dancer and choreographer

Episode 4
Katie Price, television personality

Episode 6
Billy Porter, actor, singer, and author
Sir Elton John, singer, pianist and composer
Naomi Campbell, model, actress, singer, and businesswoman

Episodes 
</onlyinclude>

Discography

References

2022 British television series debuts
2022 British television series endings
2022 in LGBT history
RuPaul's Drag Race UK
Television series by World of Wonder (company)